Ženíšek (feminine Ženíšková) is a Czech surname. Notable people include:
 František Ženíšek (1849–1916), Czech painter
 Ladislav Ženíšek (1904–1985), Czech football defender and later a football manager.

 22567 Zenisek (1998 HK33) is a main-belt asteroid discovered on April 20, 1998.

Czech-language surnames